McIlvenny is a surname. Notable people with the surname include:

Bobby McIlvenny (born 1926), Northern Irish footballer
Charles McIlvenny (born 1897), English/South African golfer
Ed McIlvenny (1924–1989), Scottish-American footballer
Harry McIlvenny (born 1922), English footballer
Jimmy McIlvenny (1892–?), English footballer